Acer may refer to:
 Acer (plant), the genus of trees and shrubs commonly known as maples
 Acer Inc., a computer company in Taiwan
 Acer Laboratories Incorporated, a subsidiary company of Acer, Inc., that designs and manufactures integrated circuits
 David Acer (born 1970), stand-up comedian and Canadian close-up magician

Acronyms
 Agency for the Cooperation of Energy Regulators (ACER), an agency of the European Union
 Armored Combat Engineer Robot (ACER), a military robot created by Mesa Robotics
 Australian Council for Educational Research (ACER), research organization based in Camberwell, Victoria

See also
ACerS, the American Ceramic Society
Acre (disambiguation)
Jude Acers (born 1944), American chess master